Reysander Fernandez Cervantes (born August 22, 1984) is a footballer from Cuba who played in the Campeonato Nacional de Fútbol de Cuba, and the Canadian Soccer League. He is a former member of the Cuba national football team.

Club career 
Fernández began his career in 2004 with FC Ciego de Ávila of the Campeonato Nacional de Fútbol de Cuba. With Ciego de Ávila he won a Campeonato Nacional de Fútbol de Cuba title in 2009. In Canada he signed with Brampton United of the Canadian Soccer League. In his debut season he helped clinch a postseason berth by finishing fourth in the overall standings. He featured in the quarterfinal match against SC Waterloo, but were eliminated by a score of 4–0.

International career
He made his international debut for Cuba in a March 2003 friendly match against Jamaica and has earned a total of 65 caps, scoring 4 goals. He represented his country in 11 FIFA World Cup qualifying matches and played at 4 CONCACAF Gold Cup final tournaments.

His final international was a September 2012 FIFA World Cup qualification match against Honduras.

International goals
Scores and results list Cuba's goal tally first.

Personal life
His brother Sánder also played for the national team.

Defection to the USA
In October 2012, he defected to the United States with teammates Heviel Cordovés, Maikel Chang, Odisnel Cooper and Ignacio Abreu after he had traveled to Toronto with the Cuba national football team for a World Cup qualifying game.

References

External links
 

1984 births
Living people
People from Morón, Cuba
Defecting Cuban footballers
Association football defenders
Cuban footballers
Cuba international footballers
2005 CONCACAF Gold Cup players
2007 CONCACAF Gold Cup players
2011 CONCACAF Gold Cup players
FC Ciego de Ávila players
FC Pinar del Río players
Brampton United players
Canadian Soccer League (1998–present) players
Cuban expatriate footballers
Cuban expatriate sportspeople in Canada
Expatriate soccer players in Canada